This is a list of people elected Fellow of the Royal Society in 1926.

Fellows 

Sir Joseph Arthur Arkwright
Sir Edwin John Butler
Sir Samuel Rickard Christophers
Francis Joseph Cole
Sir Alfred Charles Glyn Egerton
Ezer Griffiths
Sir Harold Brewer Hartley
Hamilton Hartridge
George Barker Jeffery
Owen Thomas Jones
William Cudmore McCullagh Lewis
Edward Arthur Milne
Lewis Fry Richardson
Sir Henry Thomas Tizard
Robert Scott Troup

Foreign members

Martinus Willem Beijerinck
Niels Henrik David Bohr
Ernst Julius Cohen
Willem Einthoven
Karl Immanuel Eberhard Ritter von Goebel
Henry Fairfield Osborn
Max Karl Ernst Ludwig Planck
Arnold Johannes Wilhelm Sommerfeld

1926
1926 in science
1926 in the United Kingdom